The Downtown Ponca City Historic District is a  area of historic buildings in Ponca City, Oklahoma.  The historic district is listed on the National Register of Historic Places in 2011.

The listing included 109 contributing buildings and 33 non-contributing ones.

It includes the City Hall in Ponca City, Poncan Theatre, a Department Store building, Royal Theater, several commercial buildings including the newspaper building, and the Savage Motor Company Building.

References

Historic districts on the National Register of Historic Places in Oklahoma
National Register of Historic Places in Kay County, Oklahoma
Mission Revival architecture in Oklahoma
Early Commercial architecture in the United States